Mierlo is a town in the southern Netherlands, in the municipality of Geldrop-Mierlo, North Brabant.

Mierlo is home to a few interesting buildings, for example the old Council house and the windmill in the centre of the village. Sports clubs in Mierlo are Mifano and the Hockey Club. Mierlo also has a zoo (Dierenrijk), and 2 hotels (HIP and 't Anker) and two campsites ('t Wolfsven and De Sprink). Just to the south, separated by the A67 motorway, lies the Strabrechtse Heide.

Mierlo is situated in the urban area of Eindhoven and Helmond. But it has many green areas. It lies on the edge of forests, moorlands and fields.

The spoken language is Peellands (an East Brabantian dialect, which is very similar to colloquial Dutch).

History 
The village was first mentioned in 1245 as Henricus de Mirle, and is a combination of the words for moorland and open forest. Mierlo developed in the 12th century near a castle. The castle was rebuilt in 1210 after it was destroyed, and collapsed in a storm in 1800.

The Catholic St. Lucia Church was built between 1856 and 1858. Part of the tower of the medieval church was incorporated in the new church. The nameless grist mill of Mierlo was built around 1640. It was moved in 1860 and 1992. It was restored several times and nowadays only used occasionally.

Mierlo was home to 466 people in 1840. Mierlo was an independent municipality. In 1968, the village Mierlo-Hout was transferred to Helmond. In 2003 when it was merged into Geldrop-Mierlo.

Gallery

See also 
 Geldrop-Mierlo#Notable residents

References

External links
Official Website

Municipalities of the Netherlands disestablished in 2004
Former municipalities of North Brabant
Populated places in North Brabant
Geldrop-Mierlo